The Shame is a 2009 Spanish film directed by  in his feature debut.

Plot 
An upper-middle class couple formed by Pepe and Lucía decide to "return" a child originally from Peru (Manu) whom they have fostered.

Cast

Production 
The film is an Avalon Films production, with the collaboration of TVE and support from ICAA.

Release 
The Shame screened as the first film in competition at the 12th Málaga Film Festival in April 2009. Distributed by Avalon, it was theatrically released in Spain on 30 April 2009.

Reception 
Jonathan Holland of Variety deemed the "thought-provoking" debut film to be a "solid drama" "buoyed by a well-observed script and alert perfs", although "much good work is undone by a rushed, soapy final reel".

Irene Crespo of Cinemanía rated the film 3½ out of 5 stars, writing that Planell manages to "stir with anger our social and family conscience".

Pere Vall of Fotogramas rated the film 3 out of 5 stars, deeming it to be a "lucid naturalistic chronicle of a couple in ideological crisis".

Accolades 

|-
| rowspan = "2" align = "center" | 2009 || rowspan = "2" | 12th Málaga Film Festival || colspan = "2" | Golden Biznaga ||  || rowspan = "2" | 
|-
| Best Original Screenplay || David Planell || 
|-
| rowspan = "2" align = "center" | 2010 || 24th Goya Awards || Best New Director || David Planell ||  || align = "center" | 
|-
| 19th Actors and Actresses Union Awards || Best Film Actress in a Secondary Role || Marta Aledo ||  || align = "center" | 
|}

See also 
 List of Spanish films of 2009

References 

Avalon films
2009 drama films
2000s Spanish-language films
Spanish drama films
2000s Spanish films